Henry Baldwin Harrison (September 11, 1821 – October 29, 1901) was a Republican politician and the 52nd Governor of Connecticut.

Biography
Harrison was born in New Haven, Connecticut. He graduated from Yale College as valedictorian in 1846,  where he was a member of Skull and Bones, and studied at Yale Law School. He was a member of Connecticut Sons of the American Revolution. He married Mary Elizabeth Osborne (the daughter of Yale Law School professor and U.S. Representative Thomas Burr Osborne and Ann Sherwood.)

Career
Harrison ran for office as a Whig, and in 1854, he won a seat in the Connecticut Senate (4th District). Active in the Whig Party, and author of the Personal Liberty Bill, he was instrumental in bringing about the nullification of the Fugitive Slave Law. During the years from 1855 to 1856, he was one of the men who organized the Republican Party in Connecticut. He lost a bid for Lieutenant Governor of Connecticut in 1857, and for Governor of Connecticut in 1874, but he returned to the Connecticut House of Representatives in 1865, 1873, and 1883; during his last term, he was Speaker of the House.

Harrison was elected governor in 1884, and from 1885-1887, Harrison served as Governor of Connecticut. His contributions included initiatives on prohibition and abolition of slavery. Issues of great concern to him were education and workers' rights. He served in the Legislature at the time of the Industrial Revolution and witnessed the growing problems caused by industrialization. As Governor, he created the state Bureau of Labor Statistics, and he pushed for compulsory education to the age of 16 for Connecticut's children.

Death and legacy
Harrison died in New Haven on October 29, 1901 and is interred at Grove Street Cemetery in New Haven. Harrison gave a moving eulogy at the funeral of his cousin, also a Governor of the State of Connecticut, Roger Sherman Baldwin. Harrison said, "It has been well said that Governor Baldwin was a great lawyer. He was an upright, a just, a conscientious and honorable man. Governor Baldwin was a true son of Connecticut. His memory deserves all honors from Connecticut, and from every one of her children."

References

External links
 
 Connecticut Sons of the American Revolution, 1892-1903 Yearbooks
 Harrison at Political Graveyard
National Governors Association
 The governors of Connecticut: biographies of the chief executives

1821 births
1901 deaths
Burials at Grove Street Cemetery
Republican Party governors of Connecticut
Lieutenant Governors of Connecticut
Republican Party Connecticut state senators
Republican Party members of the Connecticut House of Representatives
Politicians from New Haven, Connecticut
Sons of the American Revolution
Yale Law School alumni
Yale College alumni
Lawyers from New Haven, Connecticut
19th-century American politicians